Mike Hale (born December 14, 1972 in Dallas, Texas, United States) is an American motorcycle racer.

Career statistics

Grand Prix motorcycle racing

By season

Races by year

(key) (Races in bold indicate pole position, races in italics indicate fastest lap)

Superbike World Championship

References

External links
Profile on MotoGP.com
Profile on WSB-Archives.co.uk

1972 births
Living people
American motorcycle racers
Superbike World Championship riders
500cc World Championship riders